Petra Victoria Therésa Brylander (born 8 November 1970 in Nederkalix, Kalix Municipality, Sweden) is a Swedish actor and theatre chief.

Brylander started as background actress at Norrbottensteatern, and 1992–1995 she studied at Malmö Theatre Academy and after that she has been engaged at among Helsingborg City Theatre, and at Malmö City Theatre since 2001 (where she is theatre chief since 1 July 2007). In 2007 she performed the monologue Livet kom så plötsligt which is about a woman with Asperger syndrome.

Selected filmography
1996 – Jägarna
2001 – Fru Marianne (TV)
2001 – Vilospår (TV)
2005 – Doxa
2006 – Wallander – Den svaga punkten
2006 – Emblas hemlighet (TV)

References

External links

Petra Brylander on Malmö City Theatre's website

Living people
Swedish television actresses
Swedish stage actresses
1970 births
People from Kalix Municipality